Vladyslav Dmytrenko (born 24 May 2000) is a professional Ukrainian football striker who plays for Metalist 1925 Kharkiv.

Career
Dmytrenko is a product of the FC Volyn Sportive youth school system. He made his debut for FC Volyn Lutsk played as a substituted player in the game against FC Shakhtar Donetsk on 24 September 2016 in the Ukrainian Premier League.

He is also a member of the different Ukrainian youth representations.

References

External links 

2000 births
Living people
Ukrainian footballers
Ukrainian expatriate footballers
Ukrainian Premier League players
FC Volyn Lutsk players
FC Viktoria Köln players
FC Metalist 1925 Kharkiv players
Association football forwards
Ukraine youth international footballers
Expatriate footballers in Germany
Ukrainian expatriate sportspeople in Germany
Footballers from Lutsk